Torkeh Dari (also Romanized as Torkeh Dārī; also known as Gurka-Derre, Turka-Dara, and Turka Darreh) is a village in Qurigol Rural District, in the Central District of Bostanabad County, East Azerbaijan Province, Iran. At the 2006 census, its population was 771, in 158 families.

References 

Populated places in Bostanabad County